The Vampire is a 1957 American horror film produced by Arthur Gardner and Jules V. Levy, directed by Paul Landres, and starring John Beal and Colleen Gray. Its plot follows a San Francisco physician who inadvertently ingests pills laced with the blood of vampire bats, leading him to take on vampiric qualities. Like 1956's The Werewolf, it offered a science fiction take on a traditionally supernatural creature, although the films were produced by different production companies.

The film was released theatrically in San Francisco as a double feature with The Monster That Challenged the World. When screened on television, the film was given the alternative title Mark of the Vampire, though it is unrelated to the 1935 film of the same name starring Bela Lugosi.

Plot
In San Francisco, the late Dr. Campbell had begun experimenting with vampire bat blood just before his death. Colleague Paul Beecher finds a bottle of pills among Dr. Campbell's effects and takes them home. Dr. Beecher's daughter, Betsy, accidentally substitutes the vampire blood pills for her father's migraine tablets. As a result, the kindly Dr. Beecher starts having blackouts from the pills.

During a consultation with patient Marion Wilkins, who suffers from congenital heart problems, Paul feels unwell and asks her to return the next day. The following morning, he receives a phone call notifying him that Marion has gotten progressively ill. When he goes to visit her, he finds her terrified by his presence, and she dies suddenly. On her neck, Paul finds two puncture wounds.

Worried about his recent blackouts, Paul returns to Campbell's lab where he meets his former college chum—now the head of the university’s psychiatric department and overseer of Campbell’s research, Dr. Will Beaumont. Beaumont is accompanied by a researcher, the oddly aloof Henry Winston to determine Campbell’s progress. Will tells Paul that Dr. Campbell's research involved regressing animals’ minds to a primitive state, then reversing the process as a step toward advancing the intellect from its normal state. Paul has many questions about Campbell’s work and the pills he developed. In the evening, Beaumont retires to a nearby hotel, leaving Paul and Henry alone, Paul hoping to learn more about Campbell’s pills. The next morning, Henry is mysteriously found dead with the same puncture wounds and inexplicable disintegration of the tissue on his neck. Later, Paul is called to the hospital to perform an emergency surgery, but is unable to focus and has to leave the operating room after completing the procedure.

When Paul realizes he is responsible for the series of local murders—which he has been committing during his blackouts—he arranges for Betsy to stay with an aunt for her own safety. Paul again confronts Will about the pills, but Will assumes Paul is in a delusional state. He agrees to stay with Paul to calm him, and locks the bottle of pills in a drawer. During the night, Will witnesses Paul's transformation into a vampire; Paul then murders Will, disposing of his body in a furnace.

The following day, Sheriff Buck Donnelly—suspicious that Will may be engaging in human experiments—goes to question him. At the lab, Buck finds an audio recorder that contains a recording of Will's murder. Meanwhile, Paul's nurse, Carol Butler, is opening his office when she is confronted by Paul, who urges her to go home. Before leaving, she notices a vial of poison, and realizes Paul may be planning to commit suicide. Before she is able to leave, she witnesses Paul transform into the vampire. Buck arrives shortly after, and witnesses Carol fleeing with Paul in pursuit. She runs into a nearby wood where she is attacked by Paul, but Buck follows behind and is attacked by Paul. As Paul is about to overpower Buck, Officer Ryan arrives and shoots Paul, who falls into a shallow culvert. As he dies, his monstrous body reverts to its normal appearance.

Cast

Production
The film was shot at Hal Roach Studios in Los Angeles, California, from December 10 through 16, 1956, on a $115,000 budget.

Release
The Vampire premiered theatrically in San Francisco, California on June 14, 1957, paired as a double feature with The Monster That Challenged the World. It subsequently screened in the same double-feature format in Los Angeles beginning June 28, 1957, and later in September 1957 in several East coast cities, such as Boston and Philadelphia.

When shown on television, the film was given the alternate title Mark of the Vampire, which is also the title of a 1935 film directed by Tod Browning and starring Bela Lugosi, though the films are unrelated.

Critical response
Tom Weaver of Fangoria said The Vampire was "one of the best independent horror films of the 1950s". In a retrospective assessment of the film, Nathaniel Thompson of Turner Classic Movies praised the film's "atmospheric" musical score and its blending of genres: "Taking a cue from Blood of Dracula, The Vampire minimizes the risk of bringing back a still out-of-vogue monster by introducing elements of science fiction, a far more popular genre on movie screens at the time". Michael Toole and Jeff Stafford, also of TCM, praised the film, noting: "Unfairly lumped with other grade-B horror flicks from its era, The Vampire (1957) actually deserves some credit for adding a new spin - pill addiction - to this overexposed horror genre and placing the story in a contemporary setting". Film critic Leonard Maltin gave the movie 2 stars out of 4, noting that it had some merit and singling out Beal's performance for praise.

Home video
The Vampire was released on DVD in 2007 by MGM as a Midnite Movies Double Feature with Landres' subsequent film, The Return of Dracula (1958). In 2016, Scream Factory announced they were releasing the film on Blu-ray for the first time on April 11, 2017. This Blu-ray went out of print on February 15, 2021.

Notes

References

Sources

 Abstract available at Project MUSE.

External links
 
 
 Sci-Film's profile on The Vampire (1957)

1957 films
1957 horror films
American black-and-white films
American exploitation films
American science fiction horror films
Films directed by Paul Landres
Films scored by Gerald Fried
Films set in San Francisco
United Artists films
American vampire films
1950s English-language films
1950s American films